Trivalvaria is a genus of plant in family Annonaceae. It is found in Tropical Asia including Hainan.

Species
Plants of the World Online currently includes:
 Trivalvaria argentea (Hook.f. & Thomson) J.Sinclair
 Trivalvaria carnosa (Teijsm. & Binn.) Scheff.
 Trivalvaria casseabriae Y.H.Tan, S.S.Zhou & B.Yang
 Trivalvaria costata (Hook.f. & Thomson) I.M.Turner (Assam to Hainan, Indo-China, Peninsula Malaysia) 
 Trivalvaria kanjilalii D.Das
 Trivalvaria macrophylla (Blume) Miq. (Myanmar to W. Malesia) - type species
 Trivalvaria nervosa (Hook.f. & Thomson) J.Sinclair
 Trivalvaria rubra Y.H.Tan, S.S.Zhou & B.Yang

References

External links

Annonaceae
Annonaceae genera
Taxonomy articles created by Polbot
Taxa named by Friedrich Anton Wilhelm Miquel